Alfonsas Vincentas Ambraziūnas (12 May 1933 – 7 May 2020) was a Lithuanian sculptor known for designing the memorial sculpture at the Ninth Fort.

References

1933 births
2020 deaths
Lithuanian sculptors